Anandanagar  is a village (village code 01920300, JL no 38) in Anandanagar gram panchayat in Singur CD block in Chandannagore subdivision of Hooghly district in the Indian state of West Bengal.

Geography

Demographics
As per 2011 Census of India Anandanagar had a total population of 3,915 of which 1,916 (49%) were males and 1,999 (51%) were females. Population below 6 years was 288. The total number of literates in Anandanagar was 3,117 (85.94% of the population over 6 years).

Anandanagar had a population of 3,963 in the 2001 census.

Education

High schools
 Anandanagar A.C.Roy High School (Institution Code 17023) (Bengali medium)
Anandanagar Ramanath High school (Index code G4-002) (Bengali medium)

English Medium Schools
There are two english medium schools in Anandanagar:
 Anandanagar Kishalay School
 Icon English Medium School

Primary schools
There are five primary schools in Anandanagar:
 Anandanagar Shibtala Primary School
 Anandanagar bramhin para Primary School
 Anandanagar Porepara Primary School
 Anandanagar Hamangini Primary School
 Khosalpure Primary School

Health
There is a central government hospital 'Anandanagar Union Health Center & Rural Training Unit' under Singur unit. It has all necessary primary facilities, six-bed capacity (maternity ward), outdoor facilities for general patients.

Roads and transportation
The main road is 'Anandanagar Link Road' (length 2.7 km, width 5 m). It is the main artery of the village and it is connected to the SH 2 via Chandannagar-Nasibpur road. Another road renovated under 'Pradhan Mantri Gram Sadak Yojana' connects between Kaliwada and Singur via Rajarbathan, Boinchipota, Anandanagar, Ratanpur.

There is Auto & Trecker service to Singur, Chandannagar and Kamarkundu. The nearest railway stations are Singur railway station and Nasibpur railway station on the Howrah-Tarakeshwar section.

Clubs
 Anandanagar Brahamanpara Bayam samity
 Anandanagar Ramakrishna Sangha
 Anandanagar Agragami Sangha
 Anandanagar Brotachari Sangha
 Gandarpukur Youngstar Club
 Gandarpukur Tarun Sangha
 Gandarpukur Team Dark Riders
 Deb Design Gallery (Warehouse)
 Gandarpukur Nabin Sangha
 Khosalpur Danger Shangha
 Anandanagar Kachal Sangha

Business
Kamley Stores
Rupkatha Clothing Stores
Deb Design Gallery - All Type Printing Service (Quality Product) International
Autocad
AD Jewellery
Fresh Home Made Cake
WAX

Politics
The current Panchayat Prodhan from Anandanagar Panchayat is Amar Pore of AITC, who won the seat in Panchayat elections of 2013. Profulla Pore of AITC won this seat in 2003 and Prem Prasad Adhikari of AITC won this seat in 1998.

External links
 Anandanagar

References

Villages in Hooghly district